Engro Polymer & Chemical Limited (EPCL) is a Pakistani polymer manufacturing company which makes and markets Chlor-vinyl allied products and PVC. It is a subsidiary of conglomerate the Engro Corporation.

Founded in 1997, as a joint venture with Mistibushi and Asahi, it is only fully integrated chlorvinyl chemical complex in Pakistan.

The company has more than 70 percent local market share.

In August 2018, the company announced that they would set up a new plant to expand the production of PVC and caustic soda. Along with an efficiency project like De-super heating quenches at EDC/VCM plant.

References

Engro Corporation
Manufacturing companies based in Karachi
Companies listed on the Pakistan Stock Exchange
Chemical companies established in 1997
Pakistani companies established in 1997
Chemical companies of Pakistan